Wayside (also known as Wayside School) is a Canadian animated sitcom developed by John Derevlany and produced by Nelvana Limited. The series follows Todd, a transfer student who attends Wayside, an offbeat 30-story grammar school. It is loosely based on the Wayside School books by Louis Sachar, and several elements differ between the two works.

Derevlany conceived Wayside in 2003, leading to an hour-long television special pilot titled Wayside: The Movie that aired in 2005. Teletoon greenlit two seasons of Wayside consisting of thirteen half-hour episodes each, and they aired from 2007 to 2008; the series also aired briefly on Nickelodeon in the U.S. during this time.

Wayside received generally positive reviews from critics, who praised its clever and off-beat humour, though some criticized its differences with the Wayside School book series. The series was nominated for a "Best TV Series for Children" at the 2008 Cartoons on the Bay award ceremony. The pilot episode and the first season are both available on DVD. Season 2 is available on YouTube.

Overview
Wayside takes place in the fictional Wayside School, an unusual Escher-esque 30-story grammar school. The school had been accidentally built "sideways", with one classroom in each of the 30 stories instead of 30 classrooms on one floor. Like in the books, there are actually 29 floors in the school; the imaginary 19th floor is inhabited by the imaginary Miss Zarves. The series revolves around a new student at the school, named Todd, and his adventures adapting to life as a student at the top floor of Wayside School.

At Wayside, every floor appears to have lockers, stairs, classrooms, doors, and light fixtures. The first floor contains the principal's office; the school campgrounds, the sixteenth floor contains the faculty lounge and pool; the fifteenth  floor contains the cafeteria and kitchen; the (technically nonexistent) nineteenth floor contains a chute blocked by wooden boards, which is rumoured to be the classroom of the legendary Ms. Zarves; and the thirtieth floor contains Mrs. Jewls' classroom.

Every floor also appears to be a different colour. To add to the school's Escher-esque style, all of the features of the floors—doors, lockers, stairs, etc.—are placed in very unusual ways, as seen in the Escher artwork, Relativity. All of the floors' features are either right-side up, upside-down, sideways, or suspended high above the floor, as seen with several lockers.

Characters

Main
The main characters are Todd (voiced by Michael Cera in the pilot; Mark Rendall in the series), a transfer student who attends Mrs. Jewls's class on the thirtieth floor and struggles to adapt and conform to Wayside's offbeat academic structure, but is often picked on at school and gets sent home early on the kindergarten bus for doing nothing wrong.
Maurecia (Denise Oliver), a tomboy who wears roller skates and has an enormous crush on Todd; Dana (Lisa Ng), Wayside's resident overachiever who obsessively maintains the school's rules and acts as campaign manager for her best friend, Myron (Martin Villafana), an overweight and self-centered student who wishes to become class president. The main members of the school faculty are Mrs. Jewls (Kathy Najimy in the pilot; Kathleen Laskey in the series), Todd's scatterbrained yet endearing teacher who idolizes her students but is antagonistic towards Todd and frequently punishes him for ridiculous misendeavors such as talking in class, asking the teacher a question, resulting of him being sent home early on the kindergarten bus.
Mr. Kidswatter (Kedar Brown), the uptight and eccentric school principal who does not like doors, as he calls them goozacks, and does not care for the students, as he calls them the What-cha-ma-call-its and only refers to Todd as "344 South Fair View"; 
Louis (Sergio Di Zio), the relaxed, friendly yard teacher at Wayside who is the most popular person at Wayside; and Ms. Mush (Jayne Eastwood), the Eastern European head chef of the school cafeteria and nurse who is best known for her wisecracking personality and horrible cooking skills.

Supporting
Supporting students in Mrs. Jewls' class include, 
Shari (Lisa Ng), a female student who wears a smoky purple hooded jacket, and frequently sleeps in class; Stephen (Terry McGurrin), a boy who dresses like an elf for Halloween everyday; Jenny (Denise Oliver), a female student who has fabulous blonde hair, is a stunt performer, and dresses in an Evel Knievel-esque outfit; 
John (Terry McGurrin), a boy who is upside down, and comes from a family of upside down inventors and scientists; Joe (Peter Oldring), a student who has a large, orange afro; 
the Three Erics (Terry McGurrin, Peter Oldring, Ricky Collins), three students with similar attire that typically do activities in unison; Bebe (Denise Oliver), a female student who is a master artist; Leslie (Lisa Ng), a female student who performs tasks with her long pigtails and usually looks angry; Rondi (Denise Oliver), a rather large girl who's almost always happy; and Elizabeth (Denise Oliver) who wears a purple dress and has lemon-coloured hair.

Minor
Minor members of the school faculty are 
Mrs. Gorf (Julie Lemieux), a substitute teacher for Mrs. Jewls who had the ability to transform her students into apples before being transformed into one herself by Maurecia; 
Le Chef (Peter Oldring), the former French chef in the teacher's lounge who was to be appointed cafeteria chef in place of Ms. Mush but was later evicted from the school due to his obnoxious demeanour; Mr. Blunderbuss (Dwayne Hill), the adventurous fourteenth-floor teacher who often goes on hunting safaris throughout worldwide jungles; and Miss Zarves, the nonexistent teacher on the nonexistent nineteenth floor.

Episodes

Pilot (2005)

Season 1 (2007)

Season 2 (2007–08)

Telecast and home release
Leading to an hour-long television special pilot titled Wayside: The Movie that aired in 2005. Wayside was first premiered on Teletoon from 2007 until the final episode aired in 2008; the series also aired briefly on Nickelodeon in the U.S. during this time.

In September 2007, the pilot episode of Wayside was released and branded as Wayside: The Movie. The first season was released on August 19, 2008 under the title Wayside School: Season 1.

In 2018, the entire show and the pilot were released on Keep It Weird's YouTube channel, in wide-screen 16:9 for the first time. Back when it aired on TV, Wayside was broadcast in SD 4:3. The 16:9 version shows an extended view, with more footage on both sides.

While episodes of the TV series are in 720p wide-screen footage, the pilot movie is in SD 4:3 footage.

In addition to the videos uploaded by Keep It Weird on YouTube, Wayside can be watched in a variety of other languages, as uploaded by Treehouse TV's numerous "Treehouse Direct" YouTube channels.

Reception

Critical reception
Wayside has received generally positive reviews from critics. David Cornelius of DVD Talk described it as "a clever, often hilarious little show that demands a larger audience", praising the series' scripts and dialogue as "delight[ed] in mixing absurd humour with fond grade school memories." Adam Arsenau of DVD Verdict stated "The most satisfying part of Wayside is how the show feels perfectly balanced—it has enough wacky antics and bizarre events to satisfy young audiences, enough logical fallacies and defiant attitudes to amuse middle-aged kids, and enough clever and sardonic wit to please adults fortunate enough to find themselves in front of a television set while the show is playing," concluding that Wayside was "the perfect cartoon adventure for families of all ages." Emily Ashby of Common Sense Media gave the series 3 out of 5 stars; saying that, “This fast-paced series is packed with the zany characters and scenarios that young grade-schoolers will love. Even better, it's virtually free of content likely to bother parents.”

However, the series also drew criticism for its differences to the Wayside School books on which it was based. Alyse Wax of Blogcritics negatively compared the animated series to the books that inspired it, stating that "the series 'doesn't have the magic that the books had,' and noting that while the books provided 'wacky, silly, with odd, funny, almost-realistic-but-not-quite characters', viewers get no such character development from the animation, and expanded that while the show is shared from an adult perspective, it is not meant to be enjoyed by parents and kids" watching it together, being "geared towards younger kids". Joanna Weiss of Boston Globe offered that while viewers familiar with the character development in the book series will see that the animated series "understandably, dispenses with the nuance in favour of kid-friendly slapstick and goofy conceptual jokes", the children and parents who have not previously encountered the books "won't know what they're missing."

Michael P. Dougherty II of Fulve Drive-In gave a negative assessment of the series, describing it as "a disgrace to the novels" and believed it "totally strips away any intelligence or meaning they had." Dougherty also criticized the series' "total lack of ingenuity," and "coupled with the fact that it tainted the book series name makes this an awful, no good animated series." Louis Sachar, creator of the original Wayside School books on which the show was based, reportedly disliked Wayside, though he did like its animation style.

Awards and nominations
In 2008, Wayside received a nomination for "Best TV Series for Children" at the 2008 Cartoons on the Bay award ceremony.

Differences from the books
There are a number of notable differences between Wayside and the Wayside School books. For example, in the series, a large number of changes were made to the character of Todd; in the book series, he is not a transfer student, although two transfer students appeared the book chronology, namely Sue and Benjamin Nushmutt. However, neither Sue nor Benjamin appear in the series, and Todd instead appears to take the latter's role as "new kid". Maurecia's personality also diverges from that of the series—in the books, she is a normal girl with a love for ice cream who is never mentioned nor depicted to wear roller skates and is almost always featured with her best friend Joy, who never appears in the series.

Notes

References

External links
 

Wayside School
2000s Nickelodeon original programming
2000s Canadian animated television series
2000s school television series
2007 Canadian television series debuts
2008 Canadian television series endings
Canadian children's animated comedy television series
Canadian flash animated television series
English-language television shows
Teletoon original programming
Nickelodeon original programming
Elementary school television series
Canadian television shows based on children's books
Teen fiction
Television series by Corus Entertainment
Television series by Nelvana
Animated television series about children